Composition No. 174  (subtitled For Ten Percussionists, Slide Projections, Constructed Environment And Tape) is a live album by composer and conductor Anthony Braxton with the Arizona State University Percussion Ensemble recorded in Arizona in 1994 and released on the Leo label.

Reception

The Allmusic review by Thom Jurek stated "Without a doubt, this is Anthony Braxton at his most abstract. ... This work, though conceived by one of the most truly brilliant men of the 20th century, Composition No. 174 is proof that human beings are fallible. It may be art, but that doesn't make it enjoyable; it's duller than radio static".

Track listing
All compositions by Anthony Braxton.
 "Composition No. 174" – 44:55

Personnel
Arizona State University Percussion Ensemble directed by Dr. J. B. Smith
Sonja Branch, Kevin Fuhrman, Justin Jackson, Glen Ormiston, Arnoldo Ruiz, Steve Ridley, Mark Timko, Steve Turner, Paul Welter, Scott Werner – percussion

References

Anthony Braxton live albums
1994 live albums
Leo Records live albums